Samba Kanoute (born 30 July 1991) is a French footballer who plays as a defender but is without a club after being released by Hereford United of League Two.

Playing career
Kanoute signed with League Two club Hereford United, after impressing on trial. He made his debut on 11 September 2010, in a 2-0 defeat by Oxford United at Edgar Street, replacing O'Neil Thompson on 68 minutes.

References

External links

Profile at herefordunited.co.uk

1991 births
Living people
French footballers
French expatriate footballers
Association football defenders
Expatriate footballers in England
Hereford United F.C. players
English Football League players